In vector calculus, the Jacobian matrix of a vector-valued function of several variables is the matrix of all its first-order partial derivatives. When this matrix is square, that is, when the function takes the same number of variables as input as the number of vector components of its output, its determinant is referred to as the Jacobian determinant. Both the matrix and (if applicable) the determinant are often referred to simply as the Jacobian in literature.

This function takes a point  as input and produces the vector  as output.

where  is the transpose (row vector) of the gradient of the  component.

Some authors define the Jacobian as the transpose of the form given above.

The Jacobian determinant also appears when changing the variables in multiple integrals (see substitution rule for multiple variables).

.  Specializing further, when , that is when  is a scalar-valued function of a single variable, the Jacobian matrix has a single entry; this entry is the derivative of the function .

These concepts are named after the mathematician Carl Gustav Jacob Jacobi (1804–1851).

Jacobian matrix 

The Jacobian of a vector-valued function in several variables generalizes the gradient of a scalar-valued function in several variables, which in turn generalizes the derivative of a scalar-valued function of a single variable. In other words, the Jacobian matrix of a scalar-valued function in several variables is (the transpose of) its gradient and the gradient of a scalar-valued function of a single variable is its derivative. 

At each point where a function is differentiable, its Jacobian matrix can also be thought of as describing the amount of "stretching", "rotating" or "transforming" that the function imposes locally near that point.

If a function is differentiable at a point, its differential is given in coordinates by the Jacobian matrix. However a function does not need to be differentiable for its Jacobian matrix to be defined, since only its first-order partial derivatives are required to exist.

This approximation specializes to the approximation of a scalar function of a single variable by its Taylor polynomial of degree one, namely

.

In this sense, the Jacobian may be regarded as a kind of "first-order derivative" of a vector-valued function of several variables. In particular, this means that the gradient of a scalar-valued function of several variables may too be regarded as its "first-order derivative".

The Jacobian of the gradient of a scalar function of several variables has a special name: the Hessian matrix, which in a sense is the "second derivative" of the function in question.

Jacobian determinant 

We can then form its determinant, known as the Jacobian determinant. The Jacobian determinant is sometimes simply referred to as "the Jacobian".

The Jacobian determinant at a given point gives important information about the behavior of  near that point. This is the inverse function theorem. The absolute value of the Jacobian determinant at  gives us the factor by which the function  expands or shrinks volumes near ; this is why it occurs in the general substitution rule.

The Jacobian determinant is used when making a change of variables when evaluating a multiple integral of a function over a region within its domain. To accommodate for the change of coordinates the magnitude of the Jacobian determinant arises as a multiplicative factor within the integral. This is because the -dimensional  element is in general a parallelepiped in the new coordinate system, and the -volume of a parallelepiped is the determinant of its edge vectors.

The Jacobian can also be used to determine the stability of equilibria for systems of differential equations by approximating behavior near an equilibrium point. Its applications include determining the stability of the disease-free equilibrium in disease modelling.

Inverse 

According to the inverse function theorem, the matrix inverse of the Jacobian matrix of an invertible function is the Jacobian matrix of the inverse function.

In other words, if the Jacobian determinant is not zero at a point, then the function is locally invertible near this point, that is, there is a neighbourhood of this point in which the function is invertible.

The (unproved) Jacobian conjecture is related to global invertibility in the case of a polynomial function, that is a function defined by n polynomials in n variables. It asserts that, if the Jacobian determinant is a non-zero constant (or, equivalently, that it does not have any complex zero), then the function is invertible and its inverse is a polynomial function.

Critical points 

This means that the rank at the critical point is lower than the rank at some neighbour point.

In the case where , a point is critical if the Jacobian determinant is zero.

Examples

Example 1 

Consider the function  with   given by

Then we have

and

and the Jacobian determinant is

Example 2: polar-Cartesian transformation 

The transformation from polar coordinates  to Cartesian coordinates (x, y), is given by the function  with components:

This can be used to transform integrals between the two coordinate systems:

Example 3: spherical-Cartesian transformation 

The transformation from spherical coordinates  to Cartesian coordinates (x, y, z), is given by the function  with components:

The Jacobian matrix for this coordinate change is

Since  is the volume for a rectangular differential volume element (because the volume of a rectangular prism is the product of its sides), we can interpret  as the volume of the spherical differential volume element. Unlike rectangular differential volume element's volume, this differential volume element's volume is not a constant, and varies with coordinates ( and ). It can be used to transform integrals between the two coordinate systems:

Example 4 

The Jacobian matrix of the function  with components

is

This example shows that the Jacobian matrix need not be a square matrix.

Example 5 

The Jacobian determinant of the function  with components

is

Intuitively, if one starts with a tiny object around the point  and apply  to that object, one will get a resulting object with approximately  times the volume of the original one, with orientation reversed.

Other uses

Regression and least squares fitting
The Jacobian serves as a linearized design matrix in statistical regression and curve fitting; see non-linear least squares. The Jacobian is also used in local sensitivity and statistical diagnostics.

Dynamical systems 

If , then  is a stationary point (also called a steady state). Specifically, if the eigenvalues all have real parts that are negative, then the system is stable near the stationary point, if any eigenvalue has a real part that is positive, then the point is unstable. If the largest real part of the eigenvalues is zero, the Jacobian matrix does not allow for an evaluation of the stability.

Newton's method 

A square system of coupled nonlinear equations can be solved iteratively by Newton's method.  This method uses the Jacobian matrix of the system of equations.

See also 
 Center manifold
 Hessian matrix
 Pushforward (differential)

Notes

References

Further reading

External links 

 
 Mathworld A more technical explanation of Jacobians

Multivariable calculus
Differential calculus
Generalizations of the derivative
Determinants
Matrices
Differential operators